Saint Arnoul of Cysoing, of Flanders, and apparently martyred in 752, was a soldier.

References

External links
 Saint Arnoul

Belgian Roman Catholic saints
752 deaths
Year of birth unknown